Eorodale is a settlement in the community of Ness, on Lewis, in the Outer Hebrides, Scotland. Eorodale is within the parish of Barvas, and is situated on the B8015 between Lionel and Skigersta.

References

External links

Canmore - Lewis, Dun Eorradail site record
Canmore - Lewis, Eorodale, Chain Home Low Radar Station site record

Villages in the Isle of Lewis